Samuel Winslow was an American politician who served as 26th Mayor of Worcester, Massachusetts from 1886 to 1889.

Early life and career
Samuel Winslow was born in Newton, Massachusetts on February 28, 1827. He received his early education in the school of Newton. Upon leaving school, he was employed in the manufacture of cotton machinery, in which he showed so much inventive skill that he was made foreman in his shop at the age of twenty. He came to Worcester in 1855 and formed a co-partnership with his brother. In 1857 they began the manufacture of skates. After his brother's death Winslow continued the business until the formation of the Samuel Winslow Skate Manufacturing Company in 1886. 

Winslow was a member of the Common Council of Worcester in 1864-65. In 1885, he was elected mayor of Worcester, and was re-elected two times. He was both vice president and later president of the Worcester County Mechanic's Association.

Winslow died in Worcester on October 21, 1894 and was buried in Hope Cemetery.

References

External links
 

1827 births
1894 deaths
Mayors of Worcester, Massachusetts
People from Newton, Massachusetts